Robert "Robbie" Derschang (born March 16, 1992) is an American soccer player.

External links
 Akron Zips bio
 USSF Development Academy bio

1992 births
Living people
American soccer players
SMU Mustangs men's soccer players
Akron Zips men's soccer players
Austin Aztex players
Penn FC players
People from Englewood, Colorado
Phoenix Rising FC players
Association football defenders
Soccer players from Colorado
Sportspeople from the Denver metropolitan area
Philadelphia Union draft picks
USL League Two players
USL Championship players
United States men's youth international soccer players